WJEC may refer to:

 WJEC (exam board), a UK exam board
 WJEC (FM), a radio station (106.5 FM) licensed to serve Vernon, Alabama, United States
 World Journalism Education Congress, a triennial international academic event on journalism education